The 2002–03 ULEB Cup was the inaugural season of Europe's secondary level professional club basketball tournament, the ULEB Cup, which is organised by Euroleague Basketball. The 2003 ULEB Cup Finals were played between Pamesa Valencia and Krka, and won by Valencia, their first title in a European-wide competition. As the winners of the 2002–03 ULEB Cup, Valencia qualified for the European top-tier level 2003–04 Euroleague.

Team allocation
A total of 24 teams, instead of the initial 32, participated in the 2002–03 ULEB Cup.

Distribution
The table below shows the default access list.

Teams
League positions after Playoffs of the previous season shown in parentheses:

Round and draw dates
The schedule of the competition was as follows.

Regular season
In each group, teams played against each other home-and-away in a round-robin format. The four first qualified teams advanced to the elimination rounds, while the two last teams were eliminated.

Group A

Group B

Group C

Group D

Elimination rounds
In the elimination rounds, teams played against each other over two legs on a home-and-away basis, with the overall cumulative score determining the winner of a round. Thus, the score of one single game can be tied.

In the draw for the elimination rounds, the four group winners and four group runners-up were seeded, and the four group third-placed teams and four group fourth-placed teams were unseeded. The seeded teams were drawn against the unseeded teams, with the seeded teams hosting the second leg. Teams from the same group or the same country could not be drawn against each other.

Bracket

Source: ULEB Cup

Eighthfinals

The first legs were played on 4 February, and the second legs were played on 11 February 2003.

|}

Quarterfinals
The first legs were played on 25 February, and the second legs were played on 4 March 2003.

|}

Semifinals
The first legs were played on 18 March, and the second legs were played on 25 March 2003.

|}

Finals

The first leg was played on 15 April, and the second leg was played on 24 April 2003.

|}

Awards

Finals MVP

References

External links
Official website

 
2002-03
ULEB Cup 2002-03